The Hall of Guru or Guru Hall, also known as the Founder's Hall, is the most important annex halls in Chinese Buddhist temples for enshrining masters of various Buddhism schools. It is encountered throughout East Asia, including in some Japanese Buddhist Kaisandos. The Hall of Guru is generally situated to the west of the Mahavira Hall. Chan Buddhist temples usually have the Hall of Guru, which is followed by other schools' temples. Therefore three statues are always enshrined in the Guru Hall, namely the founder of the school, the senior monk who make significant contributions to the establishment of the school and the builder of the temple. Generally the Guru Hall in Chan Buddhism temples has Bodhidharma enshrined in the middle, the 6th Master Huineng's (638-713) statue on the left and Master Baizhang Huaihai's (720-814) statue on the right. Patriarch Bodhidharma and Damo for short, from south of ancient India, was the original ancestor of Chan Buddhism. The 6th Master Dajian Huineng was the actual founder of Chan Buddhism. After him, the Chan Buddhism in ancient China was almost changed and had far-reaching influence on Chinese traditional culture. Baizhang Huaihai was the third generation disciple of Huineng and his main achievements included: applying Chan Buddhism into practice, creating a set of regulations for Chan Buddhist temples and contributing to the steady development of Chan Buddhism.

References

Further reading

External links

Chinese Buddhist architecture
Japanese Buddhist architecture